John Jordan is an Irish judge who has been a judge of the High Court since February 2019. He was previously a barrister.

Early life 
Jordan is from Castlebar where he attended secondary school at St Gerald's College, Castlebar. He studied law at University College Dublin and at the King's Inns.

Legal career 
He was called to the Bar in 1985 and became a senior counsel in 2011. His practice encompassed criminal law and private law, including in the areas of contract law, tort law, and property law. In criminal trials, he acted for both the defence and on behalf of the Director of Public Prosecutions in matters involving sexual offences, road traffic offences, fraud, and homicide.

He acted for the DPP in the prosecution of Pádraig Nally and subsequent appeal arising out of the death of John Ward.

Judicial career 
Jordan became a judge of the High Court in February 2019. He has been the presiding judge in cases involving injunctions, company law, and family and child law.

He is the judge in charge of the Family List of the High Court.

References 

Living people
People from Castlebar
People educated at St Gerald's College, Castlebar
High Court judges (Ireland)
Irish barristers
Alumni of University College Dublin
Alumni of King's Inns
Year of birth missing (living people)